Jargylchak Game Reserve is a specially protected area located in river basins of Chong Jargylchak and Kichi Jargylchak of Jeti-Ögüz District of Issyk-Kul Region of Kyrgyzstan. It was established in 1990 to conserve and reproduce game animals such as wild boar, Capreolus, wild goat, red deer, Turkestan lynx (Lynx lynx isabellinus), Himalayan brown bear, snow leopard, golden eagle, bearded vulture, and so on.  The reserve's area is 23,098 hectares.

References
 

Game reserves in Kyrgyzstan
Protected areas established in 1990